Adrian Buchowski (born 30 September 1991) is a Polish professional volleyball player, a bronze medallist at the 2015 European League. At the professional club level, he plays for Ślepsk Malow Suwałki.

Career

National team
On April 2, 2015 was appointed to the Polish national team by head coach Stephane Antiga. After the training camp in Spała he went to team B of Polish national team led by Andrzej Kowal. He took part in 1st edition of 2015 European Games.  On August 14, 2015 he achieved first medal as senior national team player – bronze of European League. His national team won 3rd place match with Estonia (3–0).

Honours

Youth national team
 2009  European Youth Olympic Festival

Individual awards
 2009: CEV U19 European Championship – Best Scorer

References

External links
 
 Player profile at PlusLiga.pl 
 Player profile at Volleybox.net

1991 births
Living people
People from Zielona Góra
Sportspeople from Lubusz Voivodeship
Polish men's volleyball players
Volleyball players at the 2015 European Games
European Games competitors for Poland
Jastrzębski Węgiel players
Ślepsk Suwałki players
Effector Kielce players
AZS Olsztyn players
MKS Będzin players
GKS Katowice (volleyball) players
Outside hitters